The Union of Greens and Farmers (ZZS) is an agrarian political alliance in Latvia. It is made up of the Latvian Farmers' Union, Latvian Social Democratic Workers' Party, and For Latvia and Ventspils.

It is positioned in the centre or centre-right  on the political spectrum. It is orientated towards conservative, Eurosceptic, and green policies, and can be considered a centrist Nordic agrarian alliance, with nationalist and anti-liberal elements.

While the alliance's formal leader is Edgars Tavars, its leading figure and chief financial supporter is the oligarch Aivars Lembergs. The ZZS has had the world's first prime minister, Indulis Emsis (Prime Minister of Latvia in 2004), and first head of state, Raimonds Vējonis (President of Latvia 2015–19), to be affiliated with a green party.

History
The alliance was established to contest the 2002 parliamentary election by the Latvian Green Party (LZP) and Latvian Farmers' Union (LZS). It ran on an ideologically amorphous agenda and won 12 out of 100 seats in the parliament. In March 2004, Indulis Emsis from the LZP became the Prime Minister of Latvia until December of that year.

On a European level, the LZP cooperated with the European Green Party while the LZS has no formal affiliation. Before the 2004 European Parliament election, ZZS announced that if its representative was elected, he or she would join one of two political groups depending on which party they belonged to.

The alliance continued for the 2006 parliamentary election, and won 18 seats. It became part of the governing coalition, and LZP chairman Indulis Emsis, who served as Prime Minister briefly in 2004, became Speaker of the Saeima.

Aivars Lembergs was the candidate of the Union of Greens and Farmers for the position of Prime Minister in 2006, before being charged with corruption, fraud, bribery, money laundering and abuse of elected office on 20 July 2006. On 14 March 2007, Lembergs was detained by the Latvian authorities in relation to a criminal investigation.

At the 2014 European Parliament election, the ZZS won 8.3% of the vote and for the first time one of Latvia's European Parliament seats. Its MEP is Iveta Grigule who initially sat with the Europe of Freedom and Direct Democracy (EFFD) group. On 16 October 2014 Grigule defected from the EFDD to sit as an independent. This move required EFDD to co-opt a member of Poland's Congress of the New Right to remain eligible for parliamentary group status. In April 2015 she joined the Alliance of Liberals and Democrats for Europe (ALDE) group.

In the 2015 presidential election, the alliance's then-leader Raimonds Vējonis became President of Latvia and subsequently resigned his leadership of the alliance. In January 2016, after the resignation of Prime Minister Laimdota Straujuma, Liepāja Party member Māris Kučinskis became the head of government. After the 2018 Latvian parliamentary election, ZZS lost ten seats and ultimately in 2019 became a part of the opposition to the Kariņš cabinet.

Split, change of members 
In early 2022, the alliance started to break apart, with the Green Party announcing that it sees no way of further cooperation with For Latvia and Ventspils, still led by oligarch Aivars Lembergs, and ultimately on 11 June 2022 it voted to leave the alliance, later joined by the Liepāja Party. In July, the Greens and the Liepāja Party joined the Latvian Association of Regions and a political NGO led by construction contractor Uldis Pīlēns in forming the United List alliance.

The departing parties were replaced with the Latvian Social Democratic Workers' Party (LSDSP), a rival of the 1920s and 1930s, who joined ZZS on June 1st and allowed it to retain its name. The alliance once again announced Lembergs as their prime ministerial candidate.

Ideology
The Union of Greens and Farmers is based on similar sentimental feelings shared by the voters of the two groups. Latvians are supportive of traditional small farms and perceive them as more environmentally friendly than large-scale farming: Nature is threatened by development, while small farms are threatened by large industrial-scale farms. For example, after the restoration of independence, Latvia broke down Soviet-era collective farms and returned land to its original owners (or their descendants). This perception has resulted in an alliance between green and farmer's parties, which is rare in other countries.

The alliance is Eurosceptic, although not opposed to Latvian membership of the European Union. The ZZS opposed the adoption of the euro by Latvia. The party opposes granting non-citizens Latvian citizenship or voting rights in local elections.

Members

Former Members

Election results

Legislative elections

European Parliament

See also
Lithuanian Farmers and Greens Union

Notes

References

External links
Union of Greens and Farmers Official Website

Political party alliances in Latvia
Green political parties in Latvia
Green conservative parties
Agrarian parties
Centrist parties in Latvia
Eurosceptic parties in Latvia
2002 establishments in Latvia
Political parties established in 2002
Conservative parties in Latvia